Bull Alley Street is a street in the medieval area of Dublin, Ireland.

Location
Bull Alley Street runs from Bride Street to the east to Patrick Street to the west, and parallel with Bride Road. Along the southern side of the street is St Patrick's Park.

History

This street first appears on maps of Dublin in 1680 as Bull Alley. It was part of the parish of St Nicholas Within. It is probable that the Street's name is derived from the name of a tavern or inn with a sign of a bull. In the late 1800s, the street had a large number of butchers, victuallers and other jobs associated with the meat industry.

In the 1900s, the Dublin Corporation built a housing scheme on Bull Alley Street, designed by C. J. McCarthy. It was completed in 1904, and complemented the Iveagh Trust scheme adjacent. The Iveagh Trust scheme consists of eight blocks of 213 apartments built between 1901 and 1905. Both schemes replaced slums which were razed for the construction. Most of these buildings are Art Nouveau in style. The Play Centre built by the Trust in 1915, now Liberties College, was designed by L. A. McDonnell. The slums along the southern side of the Street were cleared to make way for St Patrick's Park, as the slums had reached right up the side of St Patrick's Cathedral.

References

Streets in Dublin (city)